Cerastoma is a genus of fungi in the family Ceratostomataceae.

See also 
 List of Ascomycota genera incertae sedis

References

External links 
 Index Fungorum

Sordariomycetes genera
Melanosporales